In music, Op. 210 stands for Opus number 210. Compositions that are assigned this number include:

 Milhaud – Symphony No. 1
 Strauss – Abschied von St. Petersburg